David S. Heath House, also known as The Green House and Heath-Steele-Gretencord House, is a historic home located at Oxford, Benton County, Indiana. It was built in 1908 and is a 2½-story, Queen Anne style frame dwelling. It features a one-story wraparound porch with porte cochere and projecting gabled bays. Also on the property is a contributing two-story frame carriage house.

It was listed on the National Register of Historic Places in 1999.

References

Houses on the National Register of Historic Places in Indiana
Queen Anne architecture in Indiana
Houses completed in 1908
Houses in Benton County, Indiana
National Register of Historic Places in Benton County, Indiana
1908 establishments in Indiana